Porthill is a suburb of Newcastle-under-Lyme and a ward in the Borough of Newcastle-under-Lyme in Staffordshire, England. Porthill Bank is the main backbone with streets such as Vale View, First Avenue, and Inglewood Drive leading from it.  It is a major transport link as the A500 can be easily accessed from the bottom of the bank.

Porthill, along with Bradwell and Wolstanton, is represented on the Staffordshire County Council by Graham Hutton (Conservative), as of 2021.

References

See also
Listed buildings in Newcastle-under-Lyme

Newcastle-under-Lyme